Pao turgidus is a species of freshwater pufferfish native to the Mekong basin (Cambodia, Laos, Thailand, Vietnam). It may also occur in the Chao Phraya basin in Thailand. This species grows to a length of  SL.

These pufferfish are toxic, like many other pufferfishes. In Cambodia, poisonings caused by eating pufferfish caught from lakes and rivers are common and sometimes result in fatalities. The toxin, primarily saxitoxin, is likely acquired through food, and mostly accumulates in the skin. The toxin typically found in marine pufferfishes, tetrodotoxin, is toxic to the Mekong pufferfish, and does not accumulate similarly in the skin.

References

Tetraodontidae
Fish of the Mekong Basin
Fish of Cambodia
Fish of Laos
Fish of Thailand
Fish of Vietnam
Fish described in 2000
Taxobox binomials not recognized by IUCN 

fi:Ruskopallokala